Cesare Rossi (10 November 1904 – 7 November 1952) was an Italian rower who competed in the 1928 Summer Olympics. In 1928 he was part of the Italian boat, which won the bronze medal in the coxless four event.

References

External links 
 
 

1904 births
1952 deaths
Italian male rowers
Olympic rowers of Italy
Olympic bronze medalists for Italy
Olympic medalists in rowing
Rowers at the 1928 Summer Olympics
Medalists at the 1928 Summer Olympics
European Rowing Championships medalists